Northsound Radio was the name for the original Independent Local Radio station broadcast from Aberdeen and serving the North East of Scotland. In 1995, the station split to become two separate stations.

History 
Until summer 1981, the only local radio output available to listeners in the North East of Scotland was a regional opt-out from the BBC at Beechgrove, which broadcast specialist music programmes for a couple of hours a week along with some opt-out regional news coverage. When a commercial radio franchise for Aberdeen, Peterhead and the surrounding areas was advertised by the then-regulator, the Independent Broadcasting Authority, a group of local businessmen applied under the consortium of North of Scotland Radio Ltd and won the franchise. 

After a change of name, Northsound Radio commenced broadcasting at 6am on 27 July 1981 from its original studios in an old schoolhouse on Kings Gate, near Anderson Drive in the city. Originally, the station was broadcast from 6am to 8pm each day on 1035 kHz (290 metres) and 96.9 FM (VHF).

For a two-year period from 1994, the station was the main sponsor of Aberdeen Football Club, with the logo appearing on the players' shirts.

In 1995, Northsound split its services to become Northsound 1 and Northsound 2. Northsound 1 broadcasts on 96.9FM and plays popular music from the 1990s to today, while Northsound 2 follows a 'classic gold' style, with music from the 1950s to today alongside some specialist programming. Both stations now also broadcast on DAB (Digital Audio Broadcasting)

On Tuesday 3 April 2018, Northsound 2 ceased broadcasting on 1035 AM and became a digital-only station on DAB and online. It is the first commercial radio station in Scotland - and the first of Bauer's local stations - to cease analogue broadcasting in favour of a digital switchover.

Free concerts 
From 1997 until 2007, Northsound held free music concerts in Aberdeen almost bi-annually. Northsound delivered its first major outdoor event when the Tall Ships arrived in Aberdeen, which called Free at the Quay. Following its success, Free 2000 was staged at the Queen’s Links at Aberdeen Beach followed by Free at the Dee at Duthie Park. 

Due to the numbers attending, Northsound decided to move the event to Hazlehead Park and the event was renamed to simply Free 2007. More than 30,000 people attended Free 2007 which saw Beverley Knight, McFly, Shayne Ward, Booty Luv, MacDonald Brothers, Ali Love, Unklejam and others perform free.

Northsound are also sponsors and organisers of Aberdeen's free Hogmanay street party, where in previous years stars such as Sandi Thom, Travis and Amy MacDonald have played to large crowds.

Notable DJs 

Nicky Campbell - now a BBC journalist and television presenter.
Robin Galloway - later became a continuity announcer and newsreader for Grampian Television. He now currently presents the breakfast show on Pure Radio in Glasgow & Tayside.
Alan Fisher - worked at the station as a reporter/newsreader and is now a senior correspondent with the global news channel, Al Jazeera English based in the United States.
Bobby Hain - presenter in 1980s, now head of channels at STV
Edi Stark - went on to produce programmes for BBC Radio Scotland and BBC Radio 4.

See also 
Northsound 1
Northsound 2

References

Radio stations in Aberdeen